This is a list of international presidential trips made by Joko Widodo (Jokowi), the 7th President of Indonesia. He assumed presidency on 20 October 2014. As of December 2022, Jokowi has conducted 44 foreign trips to 36 countries.

2014

2015

2016

2017

2018

2019

2020

2021

2022

Multilateral meetings
The following multilateral meetings were scheduled to take place during Jokowi's 2014–2019 term in office.

The following multilateral meetings are scheduled to take place during Jokowi's 2019–2024 term in office.

References

Joko Widodo
Lists of 21st-century trips
21st century in international relations
Widodo
Widodo, Joko
Widodo, Joko